Shoborovo is a rural locality (a village) in Nikolskoye Rural Settlement, Kaduysky District, Vologda Oblast, Russia. The population was 19 as of 2002.

Geography 
Shoborovo is located 44 km northwest of Kaduy (the district's administrative centre) by road. Verkhny Dvor is the nearest rural locality.

References 

Rural localities in Kaduysky District